The Crimes That Bind may refer to:

The Crimes That Bind (novel), or Inori no Maku ga Oriru Toki (祈りの幕が下りる時), novel by Keigo Higashino
The Crimes That Bind (2018 film), 2018 Japanese film
The Crimes That Bind (2020 film), 2020 Argentine film